Cornerstone Church, is an independent evangelical church in Nottingham, England. It is one of the largest churches in Nottingham, with some 600 people coming together to worship each Sunday morning.

History 
The church was founded in 1825, as an overflow of the Stoney Street Baptist Church from Nottingham city centre. From a Hyson Green Baptist Church, the congregation moved in 1983 to Raleigh Street in Radford.

In 2012 the congregation moved to a new church building on Castle Boulevard in Nottingham. Erected at a cost of £3.5m, the construction was funded by the 750 strong congregation.

Location 
Cornerstone Church meets at Castle Boulevard in Lenton, Nottingham.

The building is located near to the University Park and Jubilee campuses of the University of Nottingham and contributes to making Cornerstone a popular choice for students there.

Services 
There are two main services at Cornerstone on a Sunday morning: 9:15 am and 11:15 am, the services attract around 600 including a great many families. There is a considerable number of children and youth work at these services.

The evening service is held at 7.00 pm.  This is an hour long service that does not incorporate any programs for children, and so is more suited to adults.

All services are contemporary in style but retaining a strong emphasis on expository preaching and gospel teaching.

There is a weekly prayer meeting which starts at 6:30pm, just before the evening service.

Affiliations 
The church is affiliated to the Evangelical Alliance and the Fellowship of Independent Evangelical Churches.

Staff, Pastors and Elders 
As a large church in a busy city, Cornerstone has a number of different ministries and responsibilities including: outreach to International and UK students, youth work, English Language Classes, hosting various Christian conferences and supporting those from their fellowship involved in world mission. To cope with this, Cornerstone has a large team:

Pastors 
The Lead Pastor is John Russell who took over upon Peter Lewis' retirement (Peter Lewis had been the minister of Cornerstone since September 1969). The other ministers are Colin Webster and Roo Miller.

References

External links 
Cornerstone Church

Fellowship of Independent Evangelical Churches
Wollaton
Churches completed in 2012
21st-century churches in the United Kingdom